Naomi Evans (born 17 January 1992) is an Australian field hockey player.

Career
Evans was born in Goulburn, New South Wales, however she plays club hockey for the ACT team Canberra Strikers.

Evans made her international debut at the 2018 Sompo Cup  in Ibaraki, Japan.

As of May 2018, Evans is a member of the Australian women's national development squad.

References

1992 births
Living people
Australian female field hockey players
Female field hockey forwards
People from Goulburn
Surbiton Hockey Club players
Women's England Hockey League players
Sportswomen from New South Wales
21st-century Australian women